IESIDE Business Institute is a private business school located in Vigo (Spain), established in 1987.

History
Since its foundation linked to the Galician bank ABANCA, IESIDE Business School has contributed to the economic development of the euroregion Galicia-Northern Portugal. In 2009 it became an associated school of the University of Vigo.

Academic programs

Bachelor of Business Administration (BBA), taught in English and Spanish (granted by the University of Vigo), Master of Business Administration (MBA), full-time (granted by the University of Vigo), Executive MBA, Master's in Human Resources Management, International Business, Financial Management or Commercial Management and Marketing.
Senior Management Program, Management Training, Advanced Coaching, In-company Programs or Specialisation courses
IESIDE Business School has multiple exchange programs for teachers and students, mainly in the US, UK and Mexico.

Accreditation / rankings
Its accreditation level is unclear.
It is a member of the European Foundation for Management Development (EFMD).
Ranked by ElMundo.

References

External links
IESIDE Business School – Main Site (in Spanish)

Business schools in Spain
Educational institutions established in 1987
1987 establishments in Spain
University of Vigo